Queen of the Chantecler (Spanish: La reina del Chantecler) is a 1962 Spanish historical drama film directed by Rafael Gil and starring Sara Montiel, Alberto de Mendoza and Luigi Giuliani. A Spanish music hall performer gets caught up in espionage during the First World War.

Cast
 Sara Montiel as La Bella Charito 
 Alberto de Mendoza as Federico de la Torre  
 Luigi Giuliani as Santi de Acíbar  
 Greta Chi as Mata Hari  
 Gérard Tichy as Henri Duchel  
 Amelia de la Torre as Adelina  
 Milagros Leal as Doña Pura  
 Julia Caba Alba as Doña Exaltación  
 José María Seoane as Conde  
 Francisco Piquer as Rafael  
 Miguel Ligero as Don Benigno  
 Antonio Garisa as Crupier  
 Eugenia Roca 
 Mary Begoña as La Pepa  
 Isabel Pallarés
 María Isbert as Joven mujer carlista  
 José Franco as Don Pagaré  
 Pedro Osinaga as Iñaki Aguirre  
 Fernando Liger 
 Óscar San Juan as  
 José Orjas as Empresario  
 Goyo Lebrero as Empleado del Chantecler  
 José Morales 
 Rosa Palomar 
 Encarna Paso
 Carmen Rodríguez 
 Ana Mariscal as Carola, condesa de Valdeluna 
 Manolo Gómez Bur as Guardia

Release

References

Bibliography 
 Phil Powrie. Carmen on Film: A Cultural History. Indiana University Press, 2007.

External links 
 

1960s historical musical films
1960s musical drama films
Spanish historical musical films
1962 films
1960s Spanish-language films
Films directed by Rafael Gil
Films set in the 1910s
Films set in Madrid
Suevia Films films
Spanish musical drama films
1962 drama films
1960s Spanish films